The Boerentoren (officially the KBC Tower, originally the Torengebouw van Antwerpen) is a historic tall building in Antwerp, Belgium. At the time of construction it was the second tallest building in Europe by roof height (after Telefónica Building).

Designed in Art-deco style, the Boerentoren is one of Europe's very first tall buildings. The Boerentoren remained the tallest in Belgium until 1960, and is currently ranked 21st tallest in the country. The building was designed by Jan Van Hoenacker.

In 2020, the company Katoen Natie acquired the tower with the intention of turning it into a cultural institution, while The Phoebus Foundation chancellery will be responsible for organizing permanent and temporary exhibitions with works from its collection, alongside public and private collaborations.

Gallery

References

External links

VRT News site
 Tower Building in Antwerp 
 

Art Deco skyscrapers
Skyscraper office buildings in Belgium
Art Deco architecture in Belgium
Buildings and structures in Antwerp
Buildings and structures completed in 1931